Lady Mary Rennell (1901–1981), born Mary Constance Vivian Smith, was an English artist working mainly in pencil, chalk and oils.

Life and career 
Mary Rennell was the daughter of the first Lord Bicester and was educated at home by private tutors, but at 17 she joined the Slade School of Fine Art as a part-time student while also, for several months, working as a ward maid for the war wounded before the Armistice on 11 November 1918. After leaving art school she shared a studio with Diana Walton in Kennington, London. She married Francis Rodd, the explorer, diplomat and author, in 1928 and the couple went on to have four daughters.

In the 1930s Rennell was introduced to the "Oxford Group" by a friend of her mother's. This later became the Moral Re-armament Association (MRA) of which Rennell was an active participant for 18 years. In 1940 Rennell took her children to America to avoid the impact of World War II on London. Before returning to Britain, in 1943, she held a one-woman show of drawings in New York. In 1952 Rennell converted to Catholicism. From 1952 onwards she travelled extensively with her husband. In Australia she held one-woman shows in both Perth and Melbourne in 1968. She also exhibited frequently in London at the Royal Society of British Artists, The Royal Society of Portrait Painters and at the Royal Academy.

Originally Rennell mostly painted landscapes in oils but later turned to drawing in ink on rice paper. There are seven works by Rennell in the Tate's prints and drawings collection. The Arts Council of Wales and the National Library of Wales in Aberystwyth also hold examples of her work.

References

External links

1901 births
1981 deaths
20th-century English painters
20th-century English women artists
Alumni of the Slade School of Fine Art
British baronesses
Converts to Roman Catholicism
Daughters of barons
English women painters